Launch Complex 31 (LC-31) is a former launch complex at Cape Canaveral Space Force Station, Florida.

It was built in 1959 with LC-32 for the U.S. Air Force to conduct test launches of the first LGM-30 Minuteman missiles. LC-31 was built next to Navaho complex LC-9, requiring LC-10 to be demolished. These complexes were the first to feature dual launch pads, one of which was subterranean. LC-31 consisted of a blockhouse, static launch pad (31A) and missile silo (31B). The bee-hive-shaped blockhouse is 210 yards from the static pad and 330 yards from the silo.

The Air Force launched four Minuteman missiles from 31A; and 35 from the silo, 31B, between February 1, 1960 and September 23, 1969. Pad 31A was used later by the U.S. Army to test launch twelve Pershing 1a missiles.

 

The service tower has since been removed; the silo remains, and contains recovered debris from the Space Shuttle orbiter vehicle Challenger.

2015 opening of the silo

In 2015, NASA opened the silo and removed several pieces of Challenger's debris, so they could be placed on permanent display at the Kennedy Space Center Visitor Complex.

Notes

External links
Wired4Space LC-31

Cape Canaveral Space Force Station
1959 establishments in Florida